Herbert Maxwell Sobel Sr. (26 January 1912 – 30 September 1987) was an American commissioned officer with Easy Company, 2nd Battalion, 506th Parachute Infantry Regiment, in the 101st Airborne Division during World War II. Sobel was portrayed in the HBO miniseries Band of Brothers by David Schwimmer.

Early life and education
Sobel was born in Chicago, Illinois, to a Jewish family. He attended the Culver Military Academy in Indiana. He was a clothing salesman. He graduated from the University of Illinois, majoring in architecture.

Military career
Sobel enlisted in the United States Army on 7 March 1941 and volunteered for the paratroopers.  He was commissioned as a second lieutenant. Promoted to first lieutenant, Sobel commanded Company E for all of their basic training at Camp Toccoa, Georgia.  He trained his men intensively, and was eventually promoted to the rank of captain in recognition of his ability as a trainer. However, Sobel was despised by his soldiers for being petty and vindictive. In Band of Brothers, author Stephen Ambrose reports that the insults directed at Sobel by the soldiers under his command were often anti-Semitic.

After a period of training in the United Kingdom before the Normandy invasion, Sobel was reassigned from command of Easy Company to command the jump school at Chilton Foliat. First Lieutenant Thomas Meehan replaced Sobel, and was one of several officers (including Richard Winters) to succeed him in that post before the end of the war.

Sobel earned a Combat Infantryman Badge as part of Regimental Headquarters Company.

Sobel was assigned as the regimental S-4 (logistics) officer on 8 March 1945.

Later life and death
Sobel returned to the United States in 1945, and was honorably discharged from the Army on 18 March 1946.  He worked as an accountant before being recalled to active duty during the Korean War. He remained in the Army National Guard, eventually retiring at the rank of lieutenant colonel. He later married and had three children.

In 1970, Sobel shot himself in the head with a small-caliber pistol in an attempted suicide. The bullet entered his left temple, passed behind his eyes, and exited the other side of his head. Both of his optic nerves were severed by the shot, leaving him blind.  Soon afterward, he began living at a VA assisted-living facility in Waukegan, Illinois. He died there of malnutrition on 30 September 1987.  No memorial services were held for him.

Legacy
Sobel was portrayed as a petty and capricious disciplinarian in the television series Band of Brothers, generating much debate.  Stephen Ambrose gives numerous examples of this in his book. 

Since the series, his son Michael Sobel has spoken out on his behalf, and the Band of Brothers book and miniseries have been criticized for their portrayal of Sobel, and for the book's depiction of Jewish soldiers. An Ohio Jewish newspaper observed in 2022 that "in many ways, how Ambrose and the men of Easy Company thought of Sobel simply fits the stereotype of the weak Jew."  It observed that the last surviving officer of the company, the highly respected and decorated Edward Shames, was Jewish, but that "fitting less the stereotype, his Jewishness goes unnoticed."

Honors and awards
  Combat Infantryman Badge
  Parachutist Badge
  Bronze Star Medal
  American Defense Service Medal
  American Campaign Medal
  European-African-Middle Eastern Campaign Medal
  World War II Victory Medal
  National Defense Service Medal

References

Bibliography

External links
The Unvarnished Truth About Captain Herbert Sobel

1912 births
1987 deaths
United States Army personnel of World War II
Band of Brothers characters
Military personnel from Chicago
United States Army officers
University of Illinois School of Architecture alumni
Jewish American military personnel
Culver Academies alumni
20th-century American Jews
Deaths by starvation